St Paul's Cathedral, Kamloops, is the Cathedral church for the Territory of the People, Anglican Church of Canada. The Territory of the People (the Territory) was formerly known as the Diocese of Cariboo, which was dissolved because of its inability to meet tort judgments against it in respect of abuse in Indian residential schools. After dissolution of the Diocese of the Cariboo the Territory was temporarily known as The Anglican Parishes of the Central Interior. The building is an extremely modest one both in size and furniture and fittings.

The bishop having responsibility for the parishes of the Territory is the Rt. Rev. Barbara Andrews; the Dean is the Rev. Ken Gray.

Anglican cathedrals in British Columbia
Buildings and structures in Kamloops